The Women's Conference (formerly the California Governor & First Lady's Conference on Women) is a nonprofit, nonpartisan US organization and annual forum for women. The event first began in 1986 as a California government initiative for working professionals and women business owners. Since 2004, The Women's Conference has become a large event at which people such as the Dalai Lama Tenzin Gyatso, former UK Prime Minister Tony Blair, Oprah Winfrey, Barbara Walters, Jane Fonda, Martha Stewart, Tyra Banks, Sarah, Duchess of York, Tim Russert, Deepak Chopra, Tom Brokaw, Queen Rania of Jordan, Maureen Dowd, Sandra Day O'Connor, Thomas Friedman, Anna Quindlen, and Billie Jean King have spoken.

Restructured by Shriver in 2010, The Women's Conference reportedly became the "largest meeting of women in the country" and a celebration of "lives and lessons". Now known as the California Women's Conference, its main stage presentations and seminar sessions have addressed personal topics such as work-life balance, service and volunteerism, healthy lifestyles, spirituality and families, professional issues such as professional development, financial planning, entrepreneurialism and communications, as well as social issues like women's maternal health, global poverty, climate change and emergency preparedness.

The conference has been located at the Long Beach Convention Center in Long Beach, California, since 1993, usually running in the fall.

Every year, substantial portions of the event are made available free through a live streaming webcast at The Women's Conference's web site.

History
The California Women's conference first began in 1985 when the alarming failure rate of women-owned businesses became a recognized statewide concern. In an effort to help women business owners and promote available government resources, then-Governor George Deukmejian took action to create a conference focused on helping women gain access to financial, professional, and personal support. The Governor selected his hometown of Long Beach to host the first conference on September 23–24, 1985. Over 2,000 members attended. 

After its inauguration, Gloria Deukmejian soon assumed responsibility for the conference, which became known as the California Governor and First Lady's Conference. Since then, the Governor of California and his wife, the California First Lady, have traditionally played a key role in the support and promotion of the highly acclaimed event. 

In 1989, the conference was established as a nonprofit public interest organization with a bi-partisan Board of Directors—an organizational move meant to ensure that changes in the Governor's Mansion would not affect the continuity of the conference.
With each successive California administration, the size and scope of the event has expanded considerably.  Under First Lady Gayle Wilson's chairmanship (and California Governor Pete Wilson's administration) the conference expanded its focus to include corporate women. Under First Lady Sharon Davis's direction (and the administration of Governor Gray Davis) the conference added a youth leadership program.  

For over 25 years, the conference steadily became better-known. Its popularity increased significantly after the 2007 election of actor Arnold Schwarzenegger as Governor of California with the support of his wife, Maria Shriver. At her direction, it was renamed The Women's Conference and the event attracted an extensive roster of high-profile speakers and celebrities.  It has reportedly become the largest one-day conference for women in the nation. 

In 2010, the conference was attended by more than 30,000 over three days of events, a record for the conference's 27-year-old history. 

In addition, the event earned at least US$5 million to $6 million in revenues for the City Convention Center, local hotels, restaurants and other businesses.

From 2010
After the Conference's significant success from 2007, all gubernatorial support of the conference was withdrawn on the accession of Jerry Brown, Jr. as governor of California in 2010, due to the state's budget crisis.   Accordingly, the California Governor and First Lady's Conference on Women was dissolved, and in 2011 there was no California Women's Conference.

It was planned for the city of Long Beach to host the 2012 conference on September 23 and 24, 2012, at the Long Beach Convention Center, under the name California Women's Conference, with the theme "The Future is Now", building upon the conference's 25-year legacy.

Event highlights
The Women's Conference 2007 sold out in less than three days, a conference record. The conference gathered nearly 14,000 participants on Tuesday, October 23, 2007, and featured a panel discussion moderated by Shriver of five presidential candidates' spouses, Jeri Thompson, Michelle Obama, Cindy Hensley McCain, Elizabeth Edwards and Ann Romney. Bill Clinton did not attend because of a scheduling conflict, though Shriver joked that he had been "invited to serve coffee". The conversation touched on the role of the spouses in the campaign, the public's perceptions of the spouses, preparing their families for and protecting them from the campaign. Jon Stewart lampooned the first-ever "wives debate" on the October 30 edition of Comedy Central's The Daily Show.

Also in 2007, New York Times columnist and Pulitzer Prize-winning author Thomas Friedman moderated a conversation on leadership and the environment between former Prime Minister Tony Blair and California Governor Arnold Schwarzenegger. Due to the October 2007 California wildfires, Governor Schwarzenegger was unable to attend the conference in person and instead participated briefly via live satellite, giving an update on the status of the fires and fire fighters.

In 2006 the Dalai Lama delivered his "first-ever address to a women's conference" on stage with Maria Shriver. He expressed his belief that women can change the world with compassion and kindness, and reportedly led the 14,000 women through a meditation exercise.

In 2005 Barbara Walters and Maria Shriver engaged in an on-stage conversation with Sandra Day O'Connor on the heels of her decision to leave the U.S. Supreme Court.

Organization highlights
Led by Maria Shriver's belief in the "power of WE", The Women's Conference has formed partnerships, developed programs and supported initiatives that extend the inspiration of the conference for "more than just a day" and empower women everywhere.

WE Care – The Women's Health Empowerment Initiative
WE Care supports solutions to women's health issues throughout the world. In partnership with Meredith Corporation, the initiative supports the work of CARE, a leading humanitarian organization, to save the lives of thousands of pregnant women in Africa and Latin America. WE Care encourages the women of California and beyond to join the movement to empower women in the developing world to overcome extreme poverty while proving much needed funds to fight mother-to-child transmission of HIV in Zambia and train midwives in Nicaragua to assist with safe deliveries. Participants in The Women's Conference 2007 showed their support for WE Care by making financial contributions and a visual sign of support: women dipped their hands in orange and yellow paint and left handprints on a banner that Maria Shriver will hand-deliver to the Care project sites in Nicaragua and Zambia.

WE Invest – The Women's Financial Empowerment Initiative
WE Invest promotes women's financial security and economic empowerment, helping to unleash the entrepreneurial spirit of each and every California woman. WE Invest supports California-based non-profit organizations that help women overcome social and economic barriers in their journey out of poverty.

WE Lead – The Minerva Leadership Program
The Minerva Leadership Program seeks to inspire, educate and empower young women leaders who are civically oriented and socially conscious to be the architects of their own lives and to make a difference in the world. The Minerva Leadership Program inspires young women to become leaders in their homes, schools and communities. As part of this program, and in collaboration with the Women's Foundation of California, 500 ethnically and geographically diverse California women, ages 16–22, are invited as special guests to participate fully in The Women's Conference and attend two exclusive seminar sessions. Minerva Leadership Program participants must pledge to perform an additional 10 hours of service to their communities, which leads to more than 5,000 hours service to California's communities.

Minerva Awards
Created by Shriver in 2004, the Minerva Awards honors remarkable women who have stepped forward in the spirit of Minerva and changed their country with their courage, their strength and their wisdom. The Minerva Awards are presented every year at The Women's Conference. Nominees are announced prior to the conference event, typically in September.

Minerva Award recipients have made extraordinary contributions in the areas of the Arts, Health and Sciences, Community Activism, Human Rights, Business and Technology, Motherhood, Innovation, Education and Finance. Many of the nominees not only have made a significant contribution to their profession, but they also impart their knowledge and skills to the next generation either by mentoring, or by working for the inclusion and retention of women in their field.

The award is named after the Roman Goddess, Minerva, who graces the State Seal of California.

In 2007, Shriver expanded the awards to extend beyond California to honor a woman who has positively impacted the U.S. and world by honoring Eunice Kennedy Shriver, Executive Vice President of the Joseph P. Kennedy, Jr. Foundation and Founder and Honorary Chair of Special Olympics International.

The achievements of Minerva Award winners are chronicled in a permanent exhibit at The California Museum for History, Women and the Arts in Sacramento and have become part of California's official archive.

References

External links
 The Women's Conference: official website
 First Lady Maria Shriver: official website

Organizations established in 1986
Women's rights organizations
Organizations based in California
History of women in California
Women's conferences